Laserburn is a line of miniatures published in 1982 by Tabletop Games.

Contents
Laserburn miniatures were a 15mm science fiction line designed for use with the Laserburn set of tactical rules.

Reception
John Rankin reviewed Laserburn in The Space Gamer No. 55. Rankin commented that "I do recommend the Laserburn line, but with this caveat – look before you buy.  With Ral Partha's vast retail distribution, this should not be difficult.  While the figures are generally of excellent quality, the vehicles deserve close examination before you [pay] for one"

References

See also
List of lines of miniatures

Miniature figures